Spoons may refer to:

 Spoon, a utensil commonly used with soup 
 Spoons (card game), the card game of Donkey, but using spoons

Film and TV
Spoons (TV series), a 2005 UK comedy sketch show
Spoons, a minor character from The Sopranos
Spoons (Gobots), a fictional character

Music
Spoons (band), a Canadian new wave synth-pop band
Spoons (musical instrument)
Spoons (album), 2007 debut album of Wallis Bird
"Spoons", a track from the 2002 album Mali Music by Damon Albarn

Other uses
Spoons sex position
Spoons, common abbreviation for Wetherspoons, a UK chain of pubs
Spoons, as a disability metaphor in spoon theory — how much energy you have left to complete tasks before becoming exhausted
Spoon Oar (sport rowing), one with a curved blade

See also
Spoon (disambiguation)